Siirt attack may refer to one of the following:

 2015 Siirt bombing
 2018 Siirt raid